Erli Çupi (born 3 February 1997) is an Albanian professional footballer who plays as a winger for Kosovan club Ferizaj and the Albania national under-21 football team.

Club career

Early career
Çupi started his youth career with Olimpic at age of 14. After spending 1 season here, he moved at KF Tirana. Then in November 2014 he moved to A.F Dinamo where he played until the end of the season. In 2015 he signed with Skënderbeu Korçë.

On 14 October 2016 he was signed by Turkish side İstanbul Başakşehir F.K. for the U21 team in the A2 Ligi. Following his arrival, he immediately established himself as a starter under coach İsmail Demirci playing 24 matches and scoring also 5 goals.

In October 2017, Çupi returned to Albania joining FK Kukësi. He played initially for the Kukësi's B-team in the 2017–18 Albanian Second Division and in November gained the first team managed by Mladen Milinković.

International career
Çupi received his first international call up at the Albania national under-21 football team by coach Alban Bushi for a gathering between 14–17 May 2017 with most of the players selected from Albanian championships.

Career statistics

Club

References

External links
Erli Çupi profile FSHF.org

Erli Çupi profile at TFF.org

1997 births
Living people
People from Bulqizë
Albanian footballers
Association football midfielders
Albania youth international footballers
Albania under-21 international footballers
Kategoria Superiore players
KF Skënderbeu Korçë players
KF Ferizaj players
Albanian expatriate footballers
Albanian expatriate sportspeople in Turkey
Expatriate footballers in Turkey
Albanian expatriate sportspeople in Kosovo
Expatriate footballers in Kosovo